Grifton is a town in Pitt and Lenoir counties, North Carolina, United States. The population was 2,617 at the 2010 census. The Pitt County portion of the town is a part of the Greenville Metropolitan Area located in North Carolina's Inner Banks region.

History
Settlement in the area dates back to 1756, when the locale was known as Peter's Ferry. By 1764, it was known as Blount's Ford. In the 1800s Warren Bell, Inc. operated a ferry at the location, and the town was known as Bell's Ferry. It was incorporated under that name in 1883. The name was formally changed to Griffton six years later to honor local merchant C. M. A. Griffin. Soon thereafter, it became styled as Grifton.

Geography 
Grifton is located on the southern edge of Pitt County at  (35.375129, -77.433860), mostly on the northeastern side of Contentnea Creek, which forms the county line. A small portion of the town is on the southwestern side of the creek in Lenoir County. North Carolina Highway 11 passes just west of the town, leading north  to Greenville, the Pitt county seat, and southwest  to Kinston, the Lenoir county seat.

Contentnea Creek is a southeastward-flowing tributary of the Neuse River.

Demographics

2020 census

As of the 2020 United States census, there were 2,448 people, 1,103 households, and 762 families residing in the town.

2000 census
As of the census of 2000, there were 2,073 people, 812 households, and 583 families residing in the town. The population density was 1,209.4 people per square mile (468.1/km). There were 1,092 housing units at an average density of 637.1 per square mile (246.6/km). The racial makeup of the town was 63.24% White, 33.19% African American, 0.19% Native American, 0.05% Asian, 0.24% Pacific Islander, 2.32% from other races, and 0.77% from two or more races. 4.73% of the population were Hispanic or Latino of any race.

Education
Grifton is served by Grifton School with grades Pre-K through 8. It is administered by the Pitt County Public School system. High school students attend nearby Ayden-Grifton High School, which is located between Ayden and Grifton. Just south of Grifton is the private K-12 school Arendell Parrott Academy.

Higher education is provided through Pitt Community College in Winterville and Lenoir Community College in Kinston. East Carolina University is located north of Grifton in Greenville.

Constructions 
The WITN tower is a guyed TV mast with a height of  located in the town.

Local events

Shad Festival 

In 1971, citizens in the town of Grifton established the annual Grifton Shad Festival as a way to increase interest in the town and to provide family-oriented fun for all ages working together. The Shad Festival was suggested by then North Carolina extension agent Ed Comer. Most events are free and outdoors. There are now 40 events, ranging from parade and pony rides to art show, clogging, Hispanic dances, lying contest, historical museum and athletic competitions, including the Shad Toss (throwing real fish).

The annual celebration includes:
 Hickory Shad fishing contest starting January 1
 SHAD-O (Grifton's version of Bingo)
 The "Miss Grifton" pageant, a competition for high-school aged girls
 Carnival rides and games
 Craft show
 Food prepared by local churches and civic organizations
 Saturday night street dance featuring local bands

John Lawson Legacy Days 

John Lawson Legacy Days is an annual event held at the Grifton Historical Museum and Indian Village, focusing on reenactors, historic interpreters, and historical technology demonstrations. The event was first held in 2010 and is named after John Lawson, an English explorer, naturalist and surveyor who traveled through the Carolinas in 1701 and published a book about his travels in 1709. Lawson was killed by a group of Tuscarora near Grifton in 1711.

Back-N-Time Book Club 

Back-N-Time Book Club is a book club organized by the Grifton Historical Museum in combination with North Carolina Literacy to introduce children and adults to reading.

References

External links
 

Towns in Pitt County, North Carolina
Towns in North Carolina
Towns in Lenoir County, North Carolina
Greenville, North Carolina metropolitan area